Zzzap (rendered ZZZap!) is a British children's television comedy programme. The concept of the show is a giant 18 ft comic that has been brought to life. The show was broadcast on ITV from 8 January 1993 until 21 September 2001 and was produced for ten series by The Media Merchants and Meridian Broadcasting.

Format
The programme mostly followed the same format throughout its run. A title intro is shown consisting of a couple of short clips for each character from the series. It is then followed by a series of short two- or three-minute-long segments, followed by the credits. For Series 1-9, each segment was introduced by the camera zooming in on a corresponding panel on a giant comic, shot in reverse (e.g.: The Camera starting at the Panel, and pulling back into a wide shot), which was reversed in Post Production, this technique was done to aid the camera operator in aligning the camera squarely with the panel, which was especially important with Cuthbert Lilly and Smart Arty sketches, where the exact same panel graphic often physically existed on set in some form. This giant comic has a set of nine frames on it, some of which contain a character representing their segments. For Series 10, the aforementioned comic transitions were replaced with a CGI roulette of the panels. The show was designed with deaf children in mind, and so the style of the show is predominantly visual, with the sound only providing music and effects. The audience in "The Handymen" segments would also often sign clapping instead of actually clapping.

The introduction to Series 1 was filmed in Chequers Shopping Centre in Maidstone showing a boy buying a copy of a comic called "ZZZap!" from a newsagent. The comic contains a 'Free TV Zapper!' which he uses only to find that the comic has increased to an enormous 18 ft size. This introduction was abandoned from series 2 onwards, which instead showed the giant comic and then introduced each of the characters with a short video. Some computer generated additions were made in series 8, and transitions were wholly computer generated by series 10. The closing titles also changed between series.

Episodes

Syndication
The series was more recently broadcast on the CITV channel in 2006, 2007 and 2009. There were plans to broadcast the programme as part of CITV's 30th anniversary in January 2013, but this did not go ahead due to licensing issues.

The Smart Arty elements and The Handymen were repeated in the US and Canada as part of It's Itsy Bitsy Time on Fox Family and Treehouse TV, respectively, with Smart Arty being renamed to 'Art to Art with Arty Art'. The segments ran from 1999 until 2001.

ZZZap! was also screened on TVOntario in Canada in its original format, alongside the runs on  It's Itsy Bitsy Time .

The series was also broadcast on the local military forces television networks BFBS and SSVC Television as part of their children's programming blocks Children's SSVC and Room 785. The network was shown on television transmissions in Germany, Belize, Cyprus, Bosnia and Herzegovina, the Falkland Islands and Gibraltar.

Cast

Main

Recurring

Media releases
 ZZZap! The Bumper Video Comic (VHS)
 ZZZap! Vol. 2 – Holiday Special (VHS)
 ZZZap! Vol. 3 – Goes Bonkers (VHS)
 ZZZap! Vol. 4 – Goes Completely Crazy (VHS)
 The Wildest Ever ZZZap! Video (VHS)

Music
The series mainly used Library music for most of the background music. The theme tune is Keystone Chaos, composed by Ron Aspery, from the KPM library. The background music used in the majority of The Handymen sketches is Memories of the Music Hall, composed by Roger Webb, from the De Wolfe Music Library.

Track(s) used from the Music House Library (KPM Music) for Cuthbert Lilly sketches:
 Candid Camera ( 3): "Vintage Hollywood";
 Children's Hour ( 147): "Animal Capers";
 Comedy & Animation Volume I ( 367): "Busy Days";
 Comedy Classics ( 13): "English Country Garden", "He'd Have To Get Under";
 Comedy Classics 1 ( 131): "Banana Skin", "Bundle Of Fun", "Goodbye Rodney", "Jobsworth", "Morning Darling!", "Roll Up! Roll Up!", "Round the Bend", "Tea Dance", "What A Cheek!";
 Comedy Situations ( 31): "Clowns", "Comedy Rag", "Toytown";
 Tiny Tots ( 19): "Pony Trotting";
 Whimsy ( 87): "Happy Rag (a)";

Track(s) used from the Parry Music Library (BMG Production Music) for Cuthbert Lilly sketches:
 The Comedy Collection ( 016): "Follies";

Track(s) used from The London Theatre Orchestra for Cuthbert Lilly sketches:
 Great Sports Themes ( 715): "Match Of The Day (Offside)";

Track(s) used from the Carlin Library CD's (Warner Chappell Production Music) for Cuthbert Lilly sketches:
 Acoustic/Woodbind/Brass ( 162): "The Jolly Parade";
 Children/Comedy/Shorts ( 156): "Happy Oompah";
 Children/Comedy/Shorts 2 ( 176): "Toy Car";
 Comedy/Cartoon/Children ( 136): "Circus Clowns", "Coach Trip", "Fred Scuttle", "Jugglers", "Sax Of Fun", "Shark Alert";
 Comedy/TV/Entertainment ( 257): "Circus Rag";
 Fun/Novelty/Kids ( 237): "Captain Country", "Stop That Sax";
 Light-Hearted & Fun ( 144): "Ben Hill Billy", "String Holiday";
 Solo Piano - Popular Styles ( 143): "Green Tulips";
 The History of Jazz (Small Groups) ( 148): "Julliette";

Track(s) used from Sonoton Music (APM Music) for Cuthbert Lilly sketches:
 Comic Collection 4: Period Slapstick ( 165): "Dapper Flapper", "Rag 'n Bone", "Rattle Them Bones", "Scotch On The Rocks", "Supper At The Savoy";

Track(s) used from the De Wolfe Library for Cuthbert Lilly sketches:
 Loony Tunes ( 0254): "Jangle Man", "The Clowns Are In Town";

Track(s) used from FirstCom Music (Universal Production Music) for Cuthbert Lilly sketches:
 Funny Situations ( S72): "Make It Stop Ok?";

Track(s) used from BMG Production Music on RCA Label for Cuthbert Lilly sketches:
 Silent Movie Era ( 1021): "Whistle Stop";

Track(s) used for Tricky Dicky sketches:
 Archive - Famous Themes Revisited 1 ( 185): "Devil's Galop" by Charles Williams;
 Cartoon/Comedy/Children ( 150): "Friendly Panther";

Track(s) used for The Handymen sketches:
 Come Dancing by Sam Fonteyn ( 1151): "Love In June", "The Mirabelle Waltz", "The Silver Ballroom";
 Fun/Novelty/Kids ( 237): "Seaside Piano";
 Memories Of The Music Hall by Roger Webb ( 0082): "After The Ball", "Daisy Bell", "I'll Be Your Sweetheart", "Lily Of Laguna", "Memories Of The Music Hall", "Old Time Waltz", "Schoft-schoe Schottische", "The Honeysuckle And The Bee", "Why Am I Always The Bridesmaid?";
 Period Pieces/Hotel Ballroom ( 111): "Quick Waltz";
 Victoriana (Parts 1 and 2) ( 1116): "Tea Dance";
 Victorian/Edwardian ( 149): "Debutants Ball", "Lady Windermere";

Track(s) used for Smart Arty sketches:
 Classical String Quartet ( 141): "Boccherini-Minuet No. 5 In E Major" by Luigi Boccherini;

Track(s) used for Daisy Dares You sketches:
 Loony Tunes (28 BRF10): "Pocket Full Of Peanuts", "Keyboard Wizzard";

Track(s) used for Minnie The Mini Magician sketches:
 Comedy and Animation Volume 1 ( 367): "Jolly Good";
 Comedy Classics 1 ( 131): "Exit Stage Left", "Half O'Shanty";
 Comedy/TV/Entertainment ( 257): "Sitcom Tune";
 Fun/Novelty/Kids ( 237): "Custard Pie";
 Lite Whimsy ( 397): "Biscuit's Bounce";
 Loony Tunes ( 0254): "Jumping Around", "Pizzicato Bliss";
 Melody All The Way ( 480): "Big Bad Ballad_30";
 Sunny Jim ( 3437): "Dimple";
 TOPSY TURVY ( 0016): "Hello Cheeky", "Snakes and Ladders", "Tea Break", "Topsy Turvy";

Track(s) commonly used for Filler Panels (Question Mark/Dot-to-Dot/Eye Segments, etc):
 Comedy Situations ( 31): "Pink Python" by Mo Foster;
 Comedy Situations 2 ( 132): "Drag";
 Off The Wall ( 146): "Cluedo";

Track(s) used for the Zzzap Summer Specials and Christmas Annual sketches:
 Children/Well Known Tunes 2 ( 208): "Sailors Hornpipe";
 Christmas, Kids & Comedy (15 3): "Christmas Celebration", "Xmas Cracker";
 Comedy Classics ( 13): "I Do Like To Be Beside The Seaside (1)", "Jingle Bells";
 Comic Cuts ( 0026): "Jolly Jack Tar", "PC Plonker";
 Happy-Go-Lucky ( S29): "Take Me Out";
 The Spirit Of Christmas ( 1213): "We Wish You A Merry Christmas (B)";
 The World of Christmas ( 229): "Jingle Bells";

References

External links
 
 ZZZap! Comic fansite

1993 British television series debuts
2001 British television series endings
1990s British children's television series
2000s British children's television series
ITV children's television shows
Fictional comics
Television shows about comics
Television series by ITV Studios
Television shows produced by Meridian Broadcasting
Television series by Mattel Creations
ITV sketch shows
English-language television shows
Deaf culture in the United Kingdom
Arts and crafts television series